Galata is an unincorporated community in Toole County, Montana, United States. The community has a post office with ZIP code 59444, which opened on July 12, 1902.

The town was named by the Great Northern Railway for nearby Galata Ravine.

References

Unincorporated communities in Toole County, Montana
Unincorporated communities in Montana